Copalnic-Mănăștur is a commune in Maramureș County, Transylvania, Romania. It is composed of twelve villages: Berința (Kővárberence), Cărpiniș (Kővárgyertyános), Copalnic (Szurdukkápolnok), Copalnic-Deal (Kápolnokdomb), Copalnic-Mănăștur, Curtuiușu Mic (Kiskörtvélyes), Făurești (Kováskápolnok), Lăschia (Lacház), Preluca Nouă (Újharagos), Preluca Veche (Haragos), Rușor (Rózsapatak) and Vad (Révkápolnok). The general area is a historic mining region.

References

Communes in Maramureș County
Localities in Transylvania